The Elektron SidStation is a musical synthesizer sound module, built around the MOS Technology SID mixed-mode synthesizer chip originally used in the Commodore 64 home computer. It was produced by the Swedish synthesizer company Elektron, and was introduced in 1999. As the SID chip had not been manufactured for years, Elektron allegedly bought up nearly all the remaining stock. 

The company built the SidStation until 2003, when their initial supply of SID chips ran out. The last 100 units sold, the Final 100 Edition, were laser etched with a number on the front panel's bottom-left corner and sold in descending order from 100 to 1. In March 2005, Elektron claimed to have encountered an additional supply of 100 SID chips and produced 100 SidStation units, selling them for € 920, USD $950, or SEK 8200 each.

In late 2006, Elektron claimed that "100 became 200", and the prices were raised once again. This marks the third time that an additional 100 chips were being produced, each time claiming to be the "final run". This (and the fact that some aftermarket clones of original SID chips exist) has raised skepticism as to how scarce the supply actually is, and which run is actually the final run.  However, since January 18, 2007 no new SidStations have been shipped. 

As SidStations were manufactured, the company kept the price in relation to the demand, meaning that the initial SidStations were fairly cheap and later on, when the device was more sought-after, the price increased.

The appearance of the SidStation is retro and features a small LCD-display where the sound editing is done, four assignable knobs, a keypad and a controller wheel.

Different models of SidStations
Besides the standard grey model of SidStation, two other models exist. The beta models of SidStations used by Elektron and their beta testers had a shining red color. Around twelve red units were made and approximately half of them were sold to early customers and beta-test partners. Some of these partners sold their units at a later time giving a handful of metallic red SidStations being owned by private people. Besides the color, these beta machines had a slightly more aggressive character due to some voltages running higher in the filter section, as well as certain beta-testing modes and the ability to upgrade the firmware to a greater extent.  

Elektron also sold fifty black SidStation units, which had black aluminum casing and blue LEDs, contrary to the original green ones, called the Ninja Edition. This model also came with a different set of sound patches.  There is also a blue SidStation that was made as a one off, by Elektron, for a walk in customer that just happened to see the blue shell sitting unused on the shelf .

Sound of the SidStation
The sound of SidStation is, of course, very similar to that of the original Commodore 64. The SID chip is well known for being noisy. By design, the oscillators never stop outputting signal—even while not in use. It's this flaw, however, that is part of the character and sound of the SID chip.

Most SidStations contain the 6581 R4AR incarnation of the SID chip. This version is considered the best trade-off between sound, stability and conformity (which is a big deal concerning the SID chip, since they tend to sound different from unit to unit).

The SidStation is capable of producing all the waveforms of the C64, Triangle, Saw, Pulse, Mix (which is a mix between Saw and Pulse) and variable Noise. Besides this is the synth, a 4-part LFO-modulation system which can be used with Lowpass, Highpass, Bandpass and various combinations of these filters (including a Notchfilter). All of these are controllable by the four knobs on top of the SidStation.

Technical specifications
MOS6581 SID-synthesis
Brushed aluminium casing
Alphanumeric backlit 2x16 LCD display
MIDI 3*DIN5P In/Out/Thru
1/4" line level audio out
1/4" line level audio in (routed through SID-filter)
Dimensions: 240W x 70H x 200D [mm]
Powerful and user-friendly SidStation OS
Three oscillators, phase accumulation synthesis
All oscillators syncable (ringmodulation and synchronization)
Sweepable pulsewidth modulation
Resonant multi-mode analogue filter
Portamento, individual for all oscillators
Variable interval-independent portamento time
Unique wavetable function in form of 3-track mini-sequencer
Flexible 4-part LFO modulation system
Extensive MIDI support

Artists that use SidStations
Autechre
Machinae Supremacy
Daft Punk
Freezepop
Zombie Nation
The Prodigy
KMFDM
8-Bit Weapon
Mr. Pacman
Timbaland
Tarmvred
Trent Reznor
RedOne
Carbon Based Lifeforms
Kim Hiorthøy
Jaga Jazzist
Apoptygma Berzerk
Depeche Mode
Code 64
Thermostatic
Linkin Park
Robyn (SidStation shown in the video for "Hang With Me")
David Guetta
Benny Benassi
Big Bang
Girls' Generation (SNSD)
Psy
Kara (Han Jae Ho)
Tsunku
Crystal Castles
Broadcast

Further reading

External links
 SidStation homepage 
 Elektron homepage
 Press release by Elektron announcing the 2005 SidStations
 SidStation at vintagesynth.com
 ucapps
 Dedicated to the Sidstation: pictures and sounds demo

Sound modules
Commodore 64 music
Elektron synthesizers